Events in the year 1928 in Germany.

Incumbents

National level
President
 Paul von Hindenburg (Non-partisan)

Chancellor
 Wilhelm Marx (Centre) (2nd term) to 12 June, then from 28 June Hermann Müller (Social Democrats) (2nd term)

Events
 May - October – Pressa held in Cologne
 28 June – Socialist Hermann Müller succeeds Wilhelm Marx as chancellor
 1928 German federal election

Births
 1 January – Gerhard Weinberg, German-American diplomatic and military historian
 2 January – Prince Karl of Leiningen, (d. 1990)
 14 January – Hans Kornberg, biochemist (d. 2019)
 27 January – Hans Modrow, politician  (d. 2023)
 20 February –  Friedrich Wetter, Cardinal Archbishop of Munich
 23 February – Hans Herrmann, German racing driver
 3 March – Gudrun Pausewang, author (d. 2020)
 12 March – Werner Krolikowski, East German politician
 16 March – Christa Ludwig, mezzo-soprano (died 2021)
 8 April – Leah Rabin, German-born wife of former Prime Minister of Israel Yitzhak Rabin (d. 2000)
 12 April – Hardy Krüger, German actor (d. 2022)
 18 April – Karl Josef Becker, German cardinal (d. 2015)
 9 May – Peter Merseburger, German journalist and author (d. 2022)
 21 June – Wolfgang Haken, German mathematician
 23 June – Klaus von Dohnányi, German politician
 24 June – Wolfgang Altenburg, German general
 1 July – Gunnar Möller, German TV and film actor (d. 2017)
 9 July – Edmund Kalau, German aviator and missionary (d. 2014)
 15 July – Nicholas Rescher, German-American philosopher
 5 August – Albrecht Dold, German mathematician (d. 2011)
 9 August – Gerd Ruge, German journalist (d. 2021)
 15 August – Carl Joachim Classen, German classical scholar (d. 2013)
 25 August – Herbert Kroemer, German physicist
 8 November – Ursula Haverbeck, neo-Nazi activist 
 9 November – Werner Veigel, German journalist and television presenter (d. 1995)
 12 November
 Hanna Elisabeth "Hanneli" Goslar, German-born Israeli nurse and friend of diarist Anne Frank (d. 2022)
 Werner Klumpp, politician (died 2021)

Deaths
 16 January – Bernhard III, Duke of Saxe-Meiningen (born 1851)
 8 February – Theodor Curtius, German chemist (born 1857)
 27 February 
 Karl Max, Prince Lichnowsky, German diplomat, noble (born 1860)
 Jürgen Kröger, German architect (born 1856)
19 May – Max Scheler, German philosopher (born 1874)
 30 August - Wilhelm Wien, German physicist Nobel Prize laureate (born 1864)
 21 November – Heinrich XXVII, Prince Reuss Younger Line, German prince (born 1858)
 26 November – Reinhard Scheer, German admiral (born 1863)

References

 
Years of the 20th century in Germany
Germany
Germany